Andrejs Pildegovičs (born August 11, 1971) is the state secretary for Foreign Affairs of Latvia.

Education and career

Pildegovičs attended Oxford University from 1998 to 1999 in the foreign language department. He studied Chinese history at the University of St. Petersburg. He also studied at the Beijing Foreign Language Institute.

Shortly after he attended Oxford University, came the birth of his second child, Eva Pildegoviča. Pildegovičs was in the Ministry of Foreign Affairs, as head of the Middle East and Africa division, from 1999 to 2000. He was a foreign policy adviser to the President from 2000 to 2006. He worked as the chief of staff in the Chancery of the President of Latvia from 2006 to 2007.

From 2007 to 2012 he was the Ambassador of Latvia to the United States. He became ambassador on July 18, 2007. He was sent to America in June 2007, after Valdis Zatlers was elected President of Latvia. 
 
He is married and has three children.

References

External links

Living people
1971 births
Ambassadors of Latvia to the United States
People from Vladivostok
Saint Petersburg State University alumni
Alumni of the University of Oxford